Matrix Fight Night is a Mixed Martial Arts promotion in India. It is considered as biggest MMA promotion in India. It is founded and owned by leading Bollywood actor Tiger Shroff and his sister Krishna Shroff. Its headquarters is situated in Mumbai, Maharashtra. It organises MMA events in India.

The promotion have organized more than 10 events as of 31 October 2022. It often organised its fight nights in Dubai, UAE. In September 2022 MFN signed a broadcasting deal with streaming app Disney+ Hotstar. By the deal latter scheduled to stream MFN 10, fights from MFN 7 onwards .

Matix Fight Night's (MFN) fighter Anshul Jubli in 2022 participated in Road to UFC fight reality show, won it and received Ultimate Fighting Championship (UFC) contract. He became the second ever Indian fighter to sign an UFC contract after Bharat Khandhare. Jubli defeated Jeka Saragih of Indonesia in the final in February 2023. Jubli began his professional MMA career in MFN.

Indian fighter such as Digamber Singh Rawat, Sanjeet Budhwar, Puja Tomar, Angad Bisht, Rahul Thapa, Clinton Dcruz etc. perform in it and fighters from other nations Djordje Stojanovic (Serbia), Fabrício Oliveira (Brazil), Bi Dieu Nguyen (USA), Mohamad Gamal (Egypt), Atabek Abdimitalipov (Kyrgyzstan) etc.

MFN was founded in 2019 by Tiger Shroff and his mother Ayesha Shroff. Since then it have held 10 events across India and foreign nations as of 2022. The promotion organised its seventh live event the MNF 7 at  Taj Falaknuma Palace in Hyderabad in December 2021, MFN 8, 9 was held at New Delhi. In June 2022 MFN, launched its official anthem, it was sung by Siddharth Mahadevan and rapper Lil Sidley. On 18 November 2022, it held its  event MFN 10 at Dubai.

MFN airs its matches on its YouTube channel 'MFN– Matrix Fight Night'. Its founding owner Tiger Shroff is one of the highest paid Bollywood film actor. His father Jackie Shroff is also an actor. Tiger Shroff is martial arts lover and enthusiast known for his fight in films often pramote MFN.

See also
 Sport in India

References

Sports organizations
2019 establishments in Maharashtra
Organisations based in Mumbai